Darvaleh-ye Bala (also Romanized as Darvaleh-ye Bālā; also known as Darvaleh-ye ‘Olyā) is a village in Kalashi Rural District, Kalashi District, Javanrud County, Kermanshah Province, Iran. At the 2006 census, its population was 33, in 9 families.

References 

Populated places in Javanrud County